Incremental encoding, also known as front compression, back compression, or front coding, is a type of delta encoding compression algorithm whereby common prefixes or suffixes and their lengths are recorded so that they need not be duplicated. This algorithm is particularly well-suited for compressing sorted data, e.g., a list of words from a dictionary.

For example:

The encoding used to store the common prefix length itself varies from application to application. Typical techniques are storing the value as a single byte; delta encoding, which stores only the change in the common prefix length; and various universal codes. It may be combined with other general lossless data compression techniques such as entropy encoding and dictionary coders to compress the remaining suffixes.

Applications 

Incremental encoding is widely used in information retrieval to compress the lexicons used in search indexes; these list all the words found in all the documents and a pointer for each one to a list of locations. Typically, it compresses these indexes by about 40%.

As one example, incremental encoding is used as a starting point by the  GNU locate utility, in an index of filenames and directories. The GNU locate utility further uses bigram encoding to further shorten popular filepath prefixes.

References 

Lossless compression algorithms
Database index techniques